The Club de Rugby San Roque is a rugby club that was founded in 1971 in Valencia, when a teacher of the San Roque public school in the Benicalap district (Valencia) gathered a group of pupils and created an academy for this sport. Nowadays, the team is in the Regional First Division of the Valencian Rugby Federation and has a squad in every other division, including a women's team.

Among its most recent successes, is its promotion to First Division in 2000, being undefeated in the league and the achievement by the junior team of the Promotion Championship in the 2004/05 season.

Academy

For more than a decade, the club has focused numerous efforts on its junior players. The organization has consolidated junior intake from the Santa María School, Valencia, the base which maintains all its inferior squads, from Under 6 to Under 18's. Combined with this, in the months leading up to the start of each school year, its instructors begin the recruiting process conducting rugby workshops and training initiation days in many city schools.

This junior process ends when the first children grow old enough to graduate from the Under 18's and are promoted to the Senior team, no longer kicking a ball around as they warm up, rather warming up shoulder to shoulder with the seniors, all like one big family.

The time that is spent training young players comes to fruition with the many call-ups of San Roque players to the junior representative teams of the Valencian Rugby Federation and in the Spain national rugby union team, playing international tournaments.

 Rugby union in Spain

Spanish rugby union teams
Rugby clubs established in 1971
Sport in Valencia
Sports teams in the Valencian Community